The 2020–21 3. Liga is the 28th season of the third-tier football league of Slovakia since its establishment in 1993. The league is composed of 64 teams divided in four groups of 16 teams each. Teams are divided into four divisions: 3. liga Bratislava, 3. liga Západ (West), 3. liga Stred (Central), 3. liga Východ (Eastern), according to geographical separation.

League tables

Bratislava

Západ (West)

Stred (Central)

Východ (Eastern)

See also
 2020–21 Slovak First Football League
 2020–21 2. Liga (Slovakia)
 2020–21 Slovak Cup

References

3. Liga (Slovakia) seasons
3
Slovak Third League